A county-administered city  is a third-level administrative division in the Republic of China (Taiwan) below a county, which in turn is below of a province. Under the administrative structure of the ROC, it is at the same level as a township or a district. Such cities are under the jurisdiction of counties. It is also the lowest-level city in Taiwan, below a city and a special municipality. There are 14 county-administered cities currently under ROC control.

History

The first administrative divisions entitled "city" were established in the 1920s when Taiwan was under Japanese rule. At this time cities were under the jurisdiction of prefectures. After the World War II, nine (9) out of eleven (11) prefectural cities established by the Japanese government were reorganized into provincial cities based on the Laws on the City Formation.

However, the populations of Hualien (Karenkō) and Yilan (Giran) were too low to become a provincial city, but they were of more importance than urban townships. Thus the Scheme on the Local Rules in Various Counties and Cities of Taiwan Province provided for the creation of county-administered cities along with urban townships and rural townships. 

In 1951, a large scale administrative division reorganization took place in Taiwan. The size of counties shrink and the county-administered districts were abolished. This puts county-administered cities and townships into the same level in the hierarchy. Four provincial cities were also downgraded to county-administered cities after this reorganization. Since county-administered cities are based on the law for Taiwan Province, Kinmen and Lienchiang Counties of Fukien Province do not have any city under their jurisdiction.

The population criterion was originally 50,000 in the 1940s, but was raised to 100,000 in 1959, again in 1977 to 150,000, and in 2015 it was lower back to 100,000. Under the current. Currently, the Local Government Act regulates the creation of a county-administered city, in which a city needs to have a population between 100,000 and 500,000 and occupies major political, economical and cultural roles. Note that not all existing county-administered cities are qualified for the population test, they were built for historical reasons.

Current county-administered cities 
There are currently fourteen (14) county-administered cities, all in Taiwan Province:

Each county-administered city has its own local self-government bodies as stipulated in the Local Government Act: a city office and a city council. The mayor and members of the city council are elected by the residents of the city. A county-administered city is further divided into urban villages.

Timeline 
Below, unless noted otherwise in parenthesis, the newly created cities were towns that exceeded the 150,000 criteria.

Populous Townships
Townships with population more than 90,000, close to the upgrading criterion (as of March 2017)
 Caotun (草屯鎮; 98,330)
 Zhudong (竹東鎮; 96,877)
 Hemei (和美鎮; 91,159)

See also
 Administrative divisions of Taiwan
 Political divisions of Taiwan (1895–1945)
 Cities of Japan
 County (Taiwan)
 Township (Taiwan)

Notes

Words in native languages

References

External links 
 

 
Populated places in Taiwan